Mount Boennighausen is a snow-covered mountain (2,970 m) located 4 nautical miles (7 km) south-southwest of Mount Kosciuszko in the Ames Range of Marie Byrd Land. Mapped by United States Geological Survey (USGS) from surveys and U.S. Navy air photos, 1959–65. Named by Advisory Committee on Antarctic Names (US-ACAN) for Lieutenant Commander Thomas L. Boennighausen, CEC, U.S. Navy, Officer-in-Charge of the nuclear power plant at McMurdo Station, 1966. He served as Civil Engineer on the staff of the Commander, U.S. Naval Support Force, Antarctica, 1969–70 and 1970–71.

References

Volcanoes of Marie Byrd Land
Shield volcanoes
Ames Range